Black moth or Black Moth can refer to:

Moths 
Arctornis l-nigrum, black V moth
Ascalapha odorata, black witch moth
Biston betularia, peppered moth
Celiptera frustulum, black bit moth
Epicoma melanospila, black spot moth
Glacies coracina, black mountain moth
Hypena scabra, black snout moth
Idia lubricalis, glossy black idia moth
Langessa nomophilalis, black langessa moth
Metalectra tantillus, black fungus moth
Panthea acronyctoides, black zigzag moth
Parascotia fuliginaria, waved black moth
Penestola bufalis, black penestola moth
Siona lineata, black-veined moth
Trichodezia albovittata, white-striped black moth
Zale undularis, black zale moth

Others 
The Black Moth, 1921 novel by Georgette Heyer
Black Moth, stoner rock band from Leeds, England
"Black Moth", first song in Of the Wand & the Moon 2005 album Sonnenheim

See also 
Black Moth Super Rainbow, an American experimental band founded 2003
Judas as Black Moth, a 2005 compilation album of British group Current 93

Animal common name disambiguation pages